Jowzestan may refer to:
 Jowzestan, Chaharmahal and Bakhtiari
 Jowzestan, Yazd